Amnesteophis is a genus of snakes in the family Colubridae that contains the sole species Amnesteophis melanauchen. It is found in Brazil.

This small snake species was first referenced about 140 years ago by locals in Bahia, Brazil. It is most similar to the Taeniophallus occipitalis in size and features.

References 

Dipsadinae
Monotypic snake genera
Reptiles of Brazil
Reptiles described in 1863